"For All Mankind" is a phrase excerpted from the inscription on the Apollo 11 lunar plaque, which reads in part, "We came in peace for all mankind."

For All Mankind may refer to:

 For All Mankind, a 1988 book by American author and journalist Harry Hurt III
 For All Mankind (film), a 1989 documentary film drawn from original footage of NASA's Apollo program
 For All Mankind (album) a 2008 album by The Phenomenauts
 For All Mankind (TV series), a 2019 American science fiction streaming television series

See also
 7 for All Mankind, an American denim brand
 All Mankind, an Australian rock/indie rock band
 Mankind (disambiguation)